Heptapleurum heptaphyllum is a species of flowering plant in the family Rubiaceae, native to southern China, Indo-China and Japan. It was first described by Carl Linnaeus in 1771 as Vitis heptaphylla.

Schefflera rubriflora was assessed as "critically endangered" in the 2004 IUCN Red List, where it was considered endemic to Yunnan in China, but  was treated as part of the much more widely distributed Heptapleurum heptaphyllum.

References

heptaphyllum
Flora of Cambodia
Flora of South-Central China
Flora of Southeast China
Flora of Japan
Flora of Laos
Flora of Myanmar
Flora of the Philippines
Flora of the Ryukyu Islands
Flora of Taiwan
Flora of Thailand
Flora of Tibet
Flora of Vietnam
Plants described in 1771